The Phoenix Society (or Phoenix Society) may refer to:
Phoenix Society (firefighters), a fraternal organization of black firefighters
Phoenix Society of the Hellfire Club, a dining society derived from the Hellfire Club
Phoenix Society for Burn Survivors, a support organization for burn victims and their allies
Phoenix Society (now Bedford Industries), a workplace in Adelaide, Australia for people with disabilities